Tamil Nadu State Highway 10 (SH-10) connects Cuddalore with Chinnasalem. The total length of SH-10 is 102 km.

SH-10 Route: Cuddalore - Kullanchavadi - Kurinjipadi - Vadalur - Neyveli - Vridhachallam - Veppur - Chinnasalem

External links
 Cuddalore-Salem State Highway Map

State highways in Tamil Nadu